Eugène Didier Talla Nembot (born 8 March 1989), or simply Eugène Talla, is a Cameroonian footballer who plays for Al-Najaf FC as a midfielder.

Honours
Panthère du Ndé
Cameroonian Cup Winner (1): 2009

References

External links
 
 
 Didier Talla at Footmercato

1989 births
Living people
Association football midfielders
Cameroonian footballers
Cameroon international footballers
Cameroonian expatriate footballers
Panthère du Ndé players
Salalah SC players
AS Marsa players
Al-Merrikh SC players
Al-Mina'a SC players
Tunisian Ligue Professionnelle 1 players
Expatriate footballers in Tunisia
Expatriate footballers in Oman
Expatriate footballers in Sudan
Expatriate footballers in Iraq
Cameroonian expatriate sportspeople in Tunisia
Cameroonian expatriate sportspeople in Oman
Cameroonian expatriate sportspeople in Sudan
Cameroonian expatriate sportspeople in Iraq